Raksha Medal was conferred upon Military Personnel and Members of the Police and Paramilitary Forces in recognition of service in the Indo-Pakistani War of 1965.

Design

Medal 
The Medal is circular in shape, made of cupro-nickel, 35mm in diameter. It has embossed on its obverse the State Emblem 22 mm in height. On its reverse it has embossed in the centre the Rising Sun with sprays of laurel below on either side and the inscription embossed above it.

Ribbon 
The Ribbon is orange in colour, divided into four equal parts by three vertical stripes, each 3 mm in width of red, dark blue and light blue. The award may be made posthumously.

References 

Military awards and decorations of India

Recipient
RFN Kanwarpal singh Raghav
SEP Prakash Chand Pathania
Sargent Asit Kumar Bhattacharjee, IAF